Chen Hua (born October 20, 1982) is a two-time Olympic swimmer, and former World Record holder, from China. She swam for China at the 2000 and 2004 Olympics. She was born in Hangzhou, Zhejiang, China.

In December 2001, she set a short course World Record in the 800 freestyle, which stood for two months.

She swam for China at the:
Olympics: 2000 and 2004
World Championships: 1998
Asian Games: 1998
World University Games: 2003
Short Course Worlds: 1999, 2000 and 2002

References

1982 births
Living people
Swimmers from Zhejiang
Swimmers at the 2000 Summer Olympics
Swimmers at the 2004 Summer Olympics
Olympic swimmers of China
Sportspeople from Hangzhou
Medalists at the FINA World Swimming Championships (25 m)
Asian Games medalists in swimming
Swimmers at the 1998 Asian Games
Swimmers at the 2002 Asian Games
Asian Games gold medalists for China
Asian Games silver medalists for China
Medalists at the 1998 Asian Games
Medalists at the 2002 Asian Games
Universiade medalists in swimming
Universiade gold medalists for China
Universiade silver medalists for China
Universiade bronze medalists for China
Medalists at the 2003 Summer Universiade
Chinese female freestyle swimmers
21st-century Chinese women